"Il sole di domenica" is a single by Italian singer Dolcenera, released by EMI Music on 8 April 2011. It will be included in her fifth studio album, Evoluzione della specie, released in Italy on 17 May 2011.
The song is written by Dolcenera with Alessandro Finazzo, and it is produced by Dolcenera and Roberto Vernetti. Dolcenera also arranged the song.

Background and release

Dolcenera revealed the title of the single on 2 April 2011, through her Facebook profile.
On 6 April 2011, Dolcenera also revealed the cover of the single, while on 8 April 2011 it was first aired by Italian radio stations.

It was officially released as a digital download on 8 April 2011 through iTunes. Starting from 15 April 2011, the song was released through other Italian digital stores.

Composition, themes and recording
"Il sole di domenica" is a pop rock song with influences from electronic music. The song was recorded live by the whole band, and then mixed as if the recordings were obtained through computer programming.

Dolcenera explained the meaning of the song during an interview on 16 May 2011:
It is an invitation to be aware of our own personality, an invitation to our duty to express it, even if this could destroy our interior peace.

Dolcenera also claimed that she wanted to express a complex concept using a "positive" pop-sound:

There are a lot of disco-songs with rhythms similar to those of my songs, but when you go to the disco, you can hear only lines such as "on the floor", and I believe that, adding deeper concepts to these sentences, you could keep your brain in training, even when you are dancing on the floor.

Music video
The music video was premiered on Corriere della Sera's website on 22 April 2011. Starting from 25 April 2011 it was published on Dolcenera's official YouTube channel and it was first aired by Italian musical televisions.

It was directed by Alex Orlowski and filmed in Barcelona. 
The video features contrasting frames, in order to highlight the contradictions of consumerist society. It is an invitation to viewers to be aware of themselves, so that they can feel to be close to the people they love.

Track listing
Single

Il sole di domenica (Dolcenera vs. Restylers) — Digital EP

Charts

Release history

References

2011 singles
Italian-language songs
Dolcenera songs